Cinema Le Palace, formerly known as Politeama Rossini or Rossini Palace, is a building located on the Habib-Bourguiba avenue in Tunisia. It serves nowadays as a movie theater.

History 
Inaugurated on 12 March 1903 as the Politeama Rossini, it served originally as a theater for the Italian community in Tunisia. In 1923, it was re-sold and transformed to a furniture store. A few years later, it is transformed into a movie theater.

The Association de sauvegarde de la médina de Tunis (Association for the protection of the medina of Tunis) restorated his pediment during the embellishment works of the Habib-Bourgiba  avenue in 2002.

References 

Cinema of Tunisia
Culture in Tunis
Mass media in Tunis